Khwaish is an Indian television series which aired Sony Entertainment Television from 16 July 2007 to 24 April 2008.

The show started earlier in Pakistan on ARY Digital from 25 June 2007, becoming the first Indian television show legally being broadcast on Pakistan.

The series was produced in Dubai.

Plot

The show is based on the life of an Indian Muslim girl, Afreen, who is living with her family in Dubai. Afreen gets what many girls dream of: marriage into a wealthy and respectable family, as well as a handsome, loving husband, Kabir. Soon, she is expecting her first child. Whereas Azaan is in love with the wealthy and spoiled Sania, who lives in London. Azaan shares his love story with his beloved brother Kabir.

Unfortunately, Afreen's joy is short-lived. Kabir suddenly dies in an accident. Circumstances lead Afreen to marry her brother-in-law (i.e., Kabir's younger brother) Azaan, who has never got along with her. One misunderstanding after another affects the relationships in the family. However, as time passes, Azaan and Afreen begin to like each other. They fall in love. Azaan cares for Afreen. Sania lands in Dubai and try to create misunderstandings between Azaan and Afreen. But every time they come close to each other. Sania threatens Afreen for spoiling her life. So Afreen decides to leave Azaan for the sake of Sania. They decide to remain separate when Azaan comes to no the truth of Sania. And then they unite. Time passes They live happily. Afreen delivers a baby boy, Kabir, who they keep. Zarin Khan behaves rudely toward Afreen. Azaan and Afreen hate each other they decide to divorce. But Afreen decides she will not give divorce until she learns who is behind Kabir's death. Then the family realises Zarin was responsible for the family's mishaps. Azaan and Afreen start their new life with much love and care with their baby Kabir, and they live happily thereafter.

One day, they see a man who is exactly like Kabir. Is this his look-alike or had he survived the accident? Was the accident staged by someone close to them? And who should now be considered Afreen's husband? The answers to these questions form the denouement of the story.

Cast
 Sumeet Sachdev as Kabir Khan / Kamran
 Yasir Shah as Azaan Khan
 Priya Bathija as Afreen Kabir Khan / Afreen Azaan Khan 
 Anju Mahendru as Zareen Shahnawaz Khan
 Nandish Sandhu as Yasir Hassan
 Indraneel Bhattacharya as Shahnawaz Khan
 Ragesh Asthanaa as Hadi Hassan
 Behzaad Khan as Mazhar Khan 
 Ekta Sharma as Naaz 
 Aaradhana Uppal as Nadira Phuppi (Kabir and Azaan's aunt)
 Avinash Sachdev as Salman 
 Mitika Sharma as Nasreen Hassan (Afreen's sister)
 Anjali Mukhi as Naila Hussain
 Aniruddh Singh as Riaz Zardari

References

External links
 

Balaji Telefilms television series
2007 Indian television series debuts
2008 Indian television series endings
Indian television soap operas
Indian television series
Sony Entertainment Television original programming